The South Fourche LaFave River Bridge is a historic bridge in rural western Perry County, Arkansas. It is a two-span Parker pony truss bridge, carrying Arkansas Highway 7 across the South Fourche La Fave River, roughly midway between Ola and Jessieville in the eastern reaches of Ouachita National Forest.

The bridge was listed on the National Register of Historic Places in 2004.

See also
National Register of Historic Places listings in Perry County, Arkansas
List of bridges on the National Register of Historic Places in Arkansas

References

Road bridges on the National Register of Historic Places in Arkansas
Bridges completed in 1933
Parker truss bridges in the United States
Transportation in Perry County, Arkansas
National Register of Historic Places in Perry County, Arkansas
1933 establishments in Arkansas
Ouachita National Forest
Pony truss bridges
Fourche La Fave River